Acianthera pectinata  is a species of orchid.

pectinata